The New Romantic movement was a British pop-culture movement of the early 1980s, characterised by flamboyant, eccentric fashion.

New Romantics may also refer to:
"New Romantics" (song), a 2014 song by Taylor Swift
"New Romantics", a 2016 song by Hands Like Houses from Dissonants

See also 
List of New Romantics
Neuromantic (album), an album by Yukihiro Takahashi